Brother Rat and a Baby is a 1940 American comedy film directed by Ray Enright and written by John Cherry Monks, Jr. and Fred F. Finklehoffe. It is the sequel to the 1938 film Brother Rat. The film stars Priscilla Lane, Wayne Morris, Jane Bryan in her final role, Eddie Albert, Jane Wyman, and Ronald Reagan. The film was released by Warner Bros. on January 13, 1940.

Plot
Cadets Dan Crawford (Ronald Reagan), Billy Randolph (Wayne Morris) and Bing Edwards (Eddie Albert) have graduated from the Virginia Military Institute. In commemoration of this accomplishment, Bing and his loving wife, Kate (Jane Bryan), name their first-born child Commencement. But, despite the enthusiasm of the graduates, they soon discover that life after school is trickier than they expected—especially with a trouble-making baby that goes missing.

Cast
 Priscilla Lane as Joyce Winfree
 Wayne Morris as Billy Randolph
 Jane Bryan as Kate
 Eddie Albert as 'Bing' Edwards
 Jane Wyman as Claire Terry
 Ronald Reagan as Dan Crawford
 Peter B. Good as Commencement
 Arthur Treacher as Snelling
 Moroni Olsen as Major Terry
 Jessie Busley as Mrs. Brooks
 Larry Williams as Harley Harrington
 Berton Churchill as Mr. Harper
 Nana Bryant as Mrs. Harper
 Paul Harvey as Sterling Randolph
 Mayo Methot as Girl in Bus
 Edward Gargan as Cab Driver

References

External links
 
 
 
 

1940 films
American comedy films
1940 comedy films
1940s English-language films
Warner Bros. films
Films directed by Ray Enright
VMI Keydets
Films scored by Heinz Roemheld
American black-and-white films
Films set in Virginia
1940s American films